Type 51 may refer to:

 Bugatti Type 51, motor vehicle produced by the auto-maker Bugatti
 Cadillac Type 51, motor vehicle produced by the auto-maker Cadillac
 Type 51 pistol, a variant of the Chinese Type 54 pistol
 Type 51, Chinese reverse-engineered copy of US M20 Super Bazooka
 Type 051 destroyer, Chinese navy destroyer class
 Type 051B destroyer, Chinese navy destroyer class